Nasaş Gençlik ve Spor Kulübü (in English: Nasaş Youth and Sports Club), commonly known as Nasaş or Nasaşspor is a defunct professional basketball club that was based in İzmit, Turkey. The club competed in the Turkish Basketball League and was playing its home games at the İzmit Atatürk Spor Salonu.

History
Nasaşspor was founded in 1975 as the professional basketball department of Nasaş Alüminyum Sanayii ve Ticaret A.Ş. (Nasaş Aluminium Industry and Trade Co.) which operated from 1969 to 1993 as industrial companies. On July 7, 1993, as a result of the lawsuit filed by the creditor banks were given for Nasaş industry bankruptcy, Nasaşspor bearing the company's name was taken over by Ülker.

Titles & achievements
Turkish Cup
 Runners-up (2): 1991–92, 1992–93

References

External links
TBLStat.net Profile

Turkish Basketball Super League teams
Defunct basketball teams in Turkey
Basketball teams established in 1975
Sports clubs disestablished in 1993
1975 establishments in Turkey
1993 disestablishments in Turkey